The concert hall Festivalny  is an entertainment facilities in the central region of Sochi, Krasnodar Krai, Russia.

The opening of the hall took place on July 14, 1979.

References

External links
  Official website

Concert halls in Russia
Buildings and structures in Sochi
Culture in Sochi